The canton of Abbeville-2 is an administrative division of the Somme department, in northern France. It was created at the French canton reorganisation which came into effect in March 2015. Its seat is in Abbeville.

It consists of the following communes:

Abbeville (partly)
Acheux-en-Vimeu
Arrest
Béhen
Boismont
Bray-lès-Mareuil
Cahon
Cambron
Eaucourt-sur-Somme
Épagne-Épagnette
Ercourt
Estrébœuf
Franleu
Grébault-Mesnil
Huchenneville
Mareuil-Caubert
Miannay
Mons-Boubert
Moyenneville
Quesnoy-le-Montant
Saigneville
Saint-Valery-sur-Somme
Tœufles
Tours-en-Vimeu
Yonval

References

Cantons of Somme (department)